Franuel "Frankie" Amaya (born September 26, 2000) is an American professional soccer player who plays as a midfielder for Major League Soccer club New York Red Bulls. Born in Santa Ana, California, Amaya played with youth club Pateadores before playing college soccer for the UCLA Bruins. Following his freshman season with the Bruins, Amaya was selected with the first overall pick in the 2019 MLS SuperDraft by expansion club FC Cincinnati.

After playing with FC Cincinnati for two seasons, Amaya was traded to the New York Red Bulls.

Career

Youth and college
Amaya played club soccer for Pateadores SC in Orange County, California. With the club, he helped the team win the region's West Conference and was named the West Conference Best XI. Ahead of the 2018 NCAA Division I men's soccer season, Amaya was listed as a four-star recruit by TopDrawerSoccer.com, and ranked number six overall in the IMG Academy Top 150 for his graduating class. Amaya was also listed by TDS has the number one club player in Southern California, and the number four midfielder nationally.

During the 2018 season, Amaya, made 14 appearances with UCLA, 10 of which were starts. Amaya made his college soccer debut on August 24, 2018 against Coastal Carolina. With UCLA, Amaya scored twice, with his first goal coming on September 22, 2018 against UC Santa Barbara in a 1–3 loss. Amaya tallied two assists on the season with his first coming on August 28, 2018 against UC San Diego, and his second coming on October 13, 2018 against San Diego State. Amaya did not appear for any more matches with UCLA after October 28, as he joined the U.S. under 20s for the 2018 CONCACAF U-20 Championship.

At the conclusion of the 2018 Pac-12 Conference men's soccer season, Amaya was honored with Freshman All-American, First Team All-Pac-12, and Second Team All-Far West Region honors.

FC Cincinnati
On January 4, 2019, Amaya signed a Generation adidas contract with Major League Soccer forgoing his final three years of college eligibility. On January 11, 2019, he was drafted first overall in the 2019 MLS SuperDraft by FC Cincinnati.

On July 16, 2020, Amaya scored his first professional goal for FC Cincinnati in the group stage of the MLS is Back Tournament against Atlanta United, in which was the only goal of the game, a 1–0 win for FC Cincinnati.

New York Red Bulls
On April 9, 2021, Amaya was rumored to be traded from FC Cincinnati to the New York Red Bulls. The trade, which was officially confirmed on April 20, was in exchange for $950,000 in general allocation money, with an additional $125,000 of potential allocation money depending on performance incentives. On April 25, 2021, Amaya made his first appearance for New York in a 3–2 loss to Los Angeles Galaxy. On May 8, 2021, he scored his first goal for New York in a 2–0 victory over Toronto FC.

International career

Amaya made his debut with the United States national under-20 team on March 21, 2018 against France. He was also named to the squad for the CONCACAF Under-20 Championship in November 2018.

On November 30, 2020, Amaya was called up by the United States national team for a friendly against El Salvador. On December 1, he was removed from the squad after contracting COVID-19 and was replaced by Andres Perea.

Personal life
Born in the United States to Mexican parents, Amaya holds a U.S. and Mexican citizenship.

Career statistics

Club

Honors
United States U20
CONCACAF U-20 Championship: 2018

References

External links 
 
 Frankie Amaya at UCLA Athletics

2000 births
Living people
American soccer players
Association football midfielders
FC Cincinnati draft picks
FC Cincinnati players
Major League Soccer first-overall draft picks
New York Red Bulls players
Orange County SC players
Soccer players from California
Sportspeople from Santa Ana, California
UCLA Bruins men's soccer players
United States men's under-20 international soccer players
American sportspeople of Mexican descent
Major League Soccer players
USL Championship players